This is an incomplete list of music based on the works of Oscar Wilde.

Oscar Wilde was an Irish playwright, poet, novelist, short story writer and wit, whose works have been the basis of a considerable number of musical works by noted composers.  In classical genres, these include operas, ballets, incidental music, symphonic poems, orchestral suites and single pieces, cantatas, and songs and song cycles.  Of more recent times, some have been the subject of musicals and film scores. Some are direct settings of Wilde's words or libretti based on them, and some are wordless settings inspired by his writings.

List of works
The works of Oscar Wilde that have been set to music include:

The Ballad of Reading Gaol
Poem

Pete Doherty quotes the stanza beginning with "I never saw a man who looked/with such a wistful eye" in Broken Love Song on his solo album Grace/Wastelands.

Les Ballons
Les Ballons (The Balloons) is a short poem, the second of the two Fantaisies Décoratives, the first being Le Panneau (The Panel).

The Birthday of the Infanta
Short story

The Canterville Ghost
Short story (1887)

Popular music
The Austrian metal band Edenbridge recorded two songs on their 2004 album "Shine;" an instrumental intro track, "The Canterville Prophecy," and the song "The Canterville Ghost."

De Profundis
Letter

Endymion
Poem

E Tenebris
Poem. Included in his collection Rosa Mystica.

A Florentine Tragedy
Blank verse play.  Premiered not in England, but at the Deutsches Theater in Berlin, 12 January 1906, in a German translation by Max Meyerfeld.  The London premiere was on 10 June 1906.

La Fuite de la Lune
La Fuite de la Lune (The Flight of the Moon) is the second of the two poems in Impressions, the first being Les Silhouettes.

The Happy Prince
Short story

The Harlot's House
Poem

An Ideal Husband
Play

The Importance of Being Earnest
Play

Impression du matin
Poem

Impression: Le Réveillon
Poem

Le Jardin
Poem

Lady Windermere's Fan
Play

Lord Arthur Savile's Crime
Short story

Madonna mia
Poem. Included in his collection Rosa Mystica.

La Mer
Poem

The Nightingale and the Rose
Story

The Picture of Dorian Gray
Novel (1890)

Popular music
Post-punk band Television Personalities recorded a song titled "A Picture of Dorian Gray" for their 1981 album ...And Don't the Kids Just Love It. The song was covered by The Futureheads on their 2003 EP 1-2-3-Nul!.
Prog band Nirvana (UK) released a 1981 single titled "The Picture of Dorian Gray".
 "Tears And Rain" by popstar James Blunt features the line: 'Hides my true shape, like Dorian Gray' from Back to Bedlam (2003)
The Libertines' song "Narcissist", from their 2004 album The Libertines, includes the line in the chorus, 'Wouldn't it be nice to be Dorian Gray, just for a day'.
Demons & Wizards recorded a song entitled "Dorian" on their 2005 album "Touched by the Crimson King."
Kill Hannah's song "Scream", from their 2006 album Until There's Nothing Left of Us, includes the line, 'Enacting Sybil Vane in some tragic play'.
Styx's song "Sing for the Day" references the titular character with the line, 'ageless and timeless as Dorian Gray'.
 William Control titled a track on their 2010 album Noir after the protagonist
 "Ballad of Dorian Gray", a song by Michael Peter Smith
 "The Picture of Dorian Gray", a song by Cherry Five
 "Portrait", a song by Alt-J
 "Vincent", a song by Don McLean references Wilde's story "The Nightingale and the Rose" with the line "A silver thorn, a bloody rose."
 Gothic metal band Pyogenesis recorded a song titled "I Have Seen My Soul" based on the novel for their 2017 album "A Kingdom to Disappear"

Requiescat
Poem (1874), included in his collection Rosa Mystica.  Requiescat was written at Avignon seven years after his sister, Isola, died (23 February 1867), less than two months before her 10th birthday. Wilde was 12 at the time of her death.

La Sainte Courtisane
Play (fragment; 1893)

Salome
Play

The Selfish Giant
Short story

Sonnet on hearing the Dies Irae sung in the Sistine Chapel
Poem

The Sphinx
Poem

Symphony in Yellow
Poem

Poisoned Youth
Song

Unclassified

References

Sources
 Eric Blom ed., Grove's Dictionary of Music and Musicians, 5th ed., 1954

Oscar Wilde
Adaptations of works by Oscar Wilde
 
Wilde
Wilde
Wilde